Woincourt is a commune in the Somme department in Hauts-de-France in northern France. Since 13 February 2020, the commune has been a part of the newly-created regional natural park of Baie de Somme - Picardie maritime.

Toponymy
Since 1100, the latinized form of Dominica curtis was listed in The  Miracles of Saint Angilbert. The name "Waincort" appeared in a 1223 cartulary of Fouilloy, Somme. A 1301 pouillé, a type of ecclesiastical enumeration of a given geographical area, listed the name of the village as "Waincourt". "Wincourt" was cited in 1468, and finally local custom demonstrates use of "Woincourt" beginning in 1507.

Geography
Woincourt is situated 15 miles(24 km) southwest of Abbeville, at the D2 and D1925 crossroads. The village can be accessed via the A16 autoroute (Paris-Dunkirk) or the A28 autoroute (Abbeville-Rouen).

History
The area once had significant manufacturing, including a locksmith and a rifle factory. Long dependent on the Abbey of Saint-Riquier, Woincourt eventually changed to the hospice of Abbeville. The Saint-Martin church, dating from the 17th century, is located in Woincourt, as well as a monument to the local victims of World War I.

Population

See also
Communes of the Somme department

References

Communes of Somme (department)
Somme communes articles needing translation from French Wikipedia